Taiping Lake or Taipinghu may refer to:

Taiping Lake (Anhui), a lake in Anhui, China
Taiping Lake Gardens, public garden in Taiping, Perak, Malaysia
Taiping Lake (Shanghai), a lake in Taipingqiao Park, Shanghai, China